Ibrahim Salisú (born 1965 in Accra) is a Ghanaian former footballer. He played for Caracas FC, as an attacking midfielder.
 He later played with Deportivo Galicia also in the Venezuelan Primera Division before retiring from football.

References

External links 
 

1965 births
Caracas FC players
Ghanaian footballers
Living people
Association football midfielders